Fulvoclysia nerminae is a species of moth of the family Tortricidae. It is found in Russia, Asia Minor and most of Europe.

The wingspan is 21–27 mm. Adults have been recorded on wing from June to July in one generation per year.

The larvae feed within the stem and roots of Scabiosa species. The species overwinters in the larval stage.

References

Moths described in 1982
Cochylini